Vidar Busk (born 19 May 1970 in Langesund, Norway) is a Norwegian guitarist, vocalist, composer and record producer within genres blues and soul.

Career

Busk grew up in Langesund, but went to US when 15 years old, to play with the American blues artist Rock Bottom. He toured the U.S. several years before returning to Norway in 1990, and was awarded Smugetprisen 1994. Later he was awarded two times Spellemannprisen, as This year's artist in 1998 and in the blues/country class in 2003.

Busk played at Moldejazz 2011, 16 years after the formation of His True Believers.

Honors
Smugetprisen 1994
Bluesprisen 1997, from The Norwegian Blues Union
Spellemannprisen 1998, as This year's artist
Spellemannprisen 2003, in the class Blues/country

Discography

Vidar Busk and His True Believers
Stompin Our Feet With Joy (1997) (nyutgitt i 2011)
I Came Here To Rock (1998)
Atomic Swing (1999)
Civilized Life (2021)

Vidar Busk
Venus Texas (2001)
Love Buzz (2003)
Starfish (2005)

Vidar Busk and The Voo Doodz
Jookbox Charade (2007)

Vidar Busk and His Bubble of Trouble 
Troublecaster (2011)

Vidar Busk, Daniel Eriksen & Stig Sjostrom 
Hustle & Flow (2019)

References

External links

Vidar Busk Biografi – Store Norske Leksikon SNL.no (in Norwegian)
Vidar Busk & His True Believers on YouTube
The Organ Club ft. Bugge Wesseltoft & Vidar Busk on YouTube

Spellemannprisen winners
Norwegian composers
Norwegian male composers
Norwegian blues singers
Norwegian blues guitarists
Norwegian rock guitarists
Norwegian male guitarists
Grappa Music artists
Norwegian musicians
Scandinavian musicians
English-language singers from Norway
Living people
1970 births
21st-century Norwegian singers
21st-century Norwegian guitarists
21st-century Norwegian male singers
Ola Kvernberg Trio members
People from Bamble